Daya is a village on the Zanzibari island of Pemba in Tanzania. It is located in the northwest of the island, four kilometres south of Wete.

References
Finke, J. (2006) The Rough Guide to Zanzibar (2nd edition). New York: Rough Guides.

Villages in Zanzibar
Pemba Island